Eric Christopher Bennett (born 4 November 1973) is an American Paralympic archer from Surprise, Arizona and World Para-Archery Champion, as well as a Parapan American Games silver medalist. He is a four-time U.S. national champion.

He has competed three times at the Summer Paralympics and won a gold medal at the 2015 World Championships in Men's recurve.

Biography
After becoming an archer at the age of 7. He lost his right arm above the elbow in a car accident caused by a drunk driver when he was 15 years old. Bennett learned to shoot with only one arm. He joined the U.S. national team in 2007, qualifying for his first Paralympics in Beijing the following year. 

In the summer of 2015, Bennett was selected to the U.S. archery team for the 2016 Rio de Janeiro Paralympics, making this his third Paralympics.

References

Paralympic archers of the United States
Archers at the 2008 Summer Paralympics
Archers at the 2012 Summer Paralympics
Archers at the 2016 Summer Paralympics
Living people
American male archers
1973 births
Medalists at the 2015 Parapan American Games
Sportspeople from the Phoenix metropolitan area
People from Maricopa County, Arizona
21st-century American people